Vítězslav Mácha (born 6 April 1948 in Krmelín) is a Czech wrestler. He won an Olympic gold medal in Greco-Roman wrestling in 1972, competing for Czechoslovakia. He won a gold medal at the 1974 and 1977 World Wrestling Championships.

References

External links

1948 births
Living people
People from Frýdek-Místek District
Czechoslovak male sport wrestlers
Olympic wrestlers of Czechoslovakia
Wrestlers at the 1968 Summer Olympics
Wrestlers at the 1972 Summer Olympics
Wrestlers at the 1976 Summer Olympics
Wrestlers at the 1980 Summer Olympics
Czech male sport wrestlers
Olympic gold medalists for Czechoslovakia
Olympic medalists in wrestling
Medalists at the 1976 Summer Olympics
Medalists at the 1972 Summer Olympics
Olympic silver medalists for Czechoslovakia
Sportspeople from the Moravian-Silesian Region